David William Hutton (born 18 May 1985) is a Scottish professional footballer who plays as a goalkeeper for Airdrieonians. Hutton has previously played for Aberdeen, Petershill, Clyde, Queen of the South, Hamilton Academical, Greenock Morton, Ayr United, Dunfermline Athletic, Arbroath, Brechin City and Alloa Athletic.

Career

Aberdeen, Petershill Clyde
Born in Glasgow, Hutton started his career with Aberdeen, but failed to break into the first team. He was in goal for the 2003 Scottish Youth Cup final. Aberdeen lost 3–1 to Celtic. Hutton then spent a short time in the Junior League with Petershill.

Hutton signed for Clyde on 29 August 2006. He made his debut in a 1–0 Scottish Challenge Cup victory over Ayr United, and went on to establish himself as first choice goalkeeper. Hutton kept 11 clean sheets in 2006–07, and was part of the defence which boasted the best defensive record during the season. Hutton signed a new 18-month contract in January 2008. He was voted Clyde's Player of the Year for season 2007–08. Hutton was released by Clyde in June 2009 along with the rest of the out of contract players, due to the club's financial position.

Queen of the South & Hamilton
Hutton was signed by manager Gordon Chisholm for Dumfries club, Queen of the South on 29 June 2009. Hutton's sequence of four consecutive clean sheets in senior games joined the likes of Allan Ball, George Farm, Alan Davidson and David Purdie in equalling the club record.

In July 2011, Hutton moved to Hamilton Accies, but after a solitary season at the club he was released at the end of the 2011–12 season.

Greenock Morton
Hutton was listed as a substitute for Greenock Morton in their home league match on 1 September 2012, against Dumbarton, who were looking to replace Alan Combe who left Cappielow Park to join Hearts as their new goalkeeping coach. Hutton signed for the Greenock club on 11 September 2012, until the end of January 2013, where he would battle for the number one shirt with Derek Gaston. Despite only 14 minutes of action for the first team, Hutton signed a contract extension in January 2013 to keep him at the club until the end of the season. He was released by Morton at the end of the 2012–13 season.

Ayr United
Hutton signed for Ayr United in July 2013, despite a contract offer from big-spending Celtic Nation. In July 2014, Ayr United announced that Hutton had re-signed, after impressing in his first season at Somerset Park. Despite helping the side avoid relegation, Hutton was not offered a new contract and left the club in May 2015.

Dunfermline Athletic
In July 2015, Hutton signed for Scottish League One side Dunfermline Athletic after appearing in three trial matches for the side. Hutton's first season with the Pars saw him make only two competitive starts, after Sean Murdoch kept him out of the first-team. His first appearance came a week after Dunfermline won the league title, in a 1–0 win against Albion Rovers at Cliftonhill. His only other start came two weeks later in a 4–1 defeat against Stranraer.

For his second season with the side Hutton chose 43 as his squad number, which was his squad number whilst with Aberdeen. In addition to this, Hutton decided that he would have 'Sinclair–Hutton' printed on his jersey, as a tribute to his wife's father who he said had played "a big part of [his] life". After a wrist injury kept first choice keeper Murdoch out of action, Hutton started the season in goal for the Pars making appearances in both the League Cup and Championship. However, with Murdoch's return from injury in September 2016, Hutton found his first-team chances limited and at the end of the season, he was one of a number of players to be released by the club.

Later career
Hutton subsequently signed with Scottish League One club Arbroath on 21 July 2017. After one season, he was released by Arbroath in May 2018, signing for league rivals Airdrieonians shortly after. On 2 January 2021, Hutton left Airdrieonians by mutual consent and immediately signed with Scottish League Two club Brechin City on an 18-month deal.

Hutton signed for Alloa Athletic in July 2021.

Career statistics

Honours

Club
Dunfermline Athletic
Scottish League One: 2015–16

Individual
Clyde FC Player of the Year
Winner: 2007–08

References

External links

1985 births
Living people
Footballers from Glasgow
Scottish footballers
Aberdeen F.C. players
Petershill F.C. players
Clyde F.C. players
Queen of the South F.C. players
Hamilton Academical F.C. players
Scottish Football League players
Association football goalkeepers
Greenock Morton F.C. players
Ayr United F.C. players
Dunfermline Athletic F.C. players
Arbroath F.C. players
Airdrieonians F.C. players
Scottish Junior Football Association players
Scottish Professional Football League players
Brechin City F.C. players
Alloa Athletic F.C. players